Demetre Gurieli (died ), of the House of Gurieli, was Prince of Guria from 1658 to 1668 and King of Imereti from 1663 to 1664. His rule in Guria as well as in Imereti were result of coups and part of a chaotic civil war raging in these western Georgian polities. Demetre's royal career in Imereti terminated with his deposition and blinding. 

Demetre was a member of the Gurieli, a family of princes-regnant of Guria. His parentage is not directly attested in the surviving chronicles and documents; Demetre appears to have been a son of Simon I Gurieli, a patricide, who was deposed and blinded in 1626. Demetre emerged from obscurity in 1658, when he was installed in Guria by King Alexander III of Imereti in place of his relative Kaikhosro I Gurieli, whom the king had deposed and forced into exile in Istanbul. Formerly an Orthodox monk, Demetre recompensed his act of unfrocking by donating the church of the Redeemer in Aketi as a metochion to the patriarchal see of Bichvinta. In 1660, Kaikhosro, with Ottoman support, returned and put Demetre to flight to Imereti. Demetre was able to resume his rule in Guria after having Prince Machutadze murdered Kaikhosro.

In the conflict with Kaikhosro, Demetre relied on Vameq III Dadiani, an ambitious prince of Mingrelia and briefly king of Imereti, whom he eventually betrayed and joined King Vakhtang V of Kartli, who intervened in the chaotic civil war in Imereti in 1661. Amid a series of coups and counter-coups, one part of the Imeretian nobles made Demetre king after the abdication of Vakhtang V's son Archil in 1663. His rule proved short-lived: the Imeretians caught, blinded, and expelled him and restored Bagrat V. According to the 18th-century Georgian historian Prince Vakhushti, Demetre's final downfall occurred in 1668. Thereafter he disappeared from history. As prince of Guria, he was succeeded by Giorgi III Gurieli, an exiled son of his erstwhile foe, Kaikhosro Gurieli. Vakhushti's dating is sometimes questioned in modern historiography, notably by Davit Khakhutaishvili, who argued that Demetre's rule in Guria should have ended no later than 1664.

References

Kings of Imereti
1668 deaths
Year of birth unknown
House of Gurieli
Eastern Orthodox monarchs
17th-century people from Georgia (country)